Él may refer to:
 Él, 1926 autobiographical novel by Mercedes Pinto 
 Él (visual novel), a 2000 Japanese adult visual novel
 Él (film), a Mexican film directed by Luis Buñuel, based upon the novel by Mercedes Pinto
 Él (Lucero album)
 "Él" (Lucía song), the Spanish entry in the Eurovision Song Contest 1982, performed in Spanish by Lucía
 Él (record label), an independent record label from the UK founded by Mike Alway

See also 
 El (disambiguation)